Curveulima abrupta is a species of sea snail, a marine gastropod mollusk in the family Eulimidae. The species is one of a number within the genus Curveulima. It was described in 1955.

Distribution
This marine species is endemic to Australia and occurs off New South Wales.

References

 Laseron, C. 1955. Revision of the New South Wales eulimoid shells. Australian Zoologist 12(2): 83-107, pls 1-3, figs 1-78.
 Iredale, T. & McMichael, D.F. 1962. A reference list of the marine Mollusca of New South Wales. Memoirs of the Australian Museum 11: 1-109 
 Wilson, B. 1993. Australian Marine Shells. Prosobranch Gastropods. Kallaroo, Western Australia : Odyssey Publishing Vol. 1 408 pp.

External links
 To World Register of Marine Species

Eulimidae
Gastropods of Australia
Gastropods described in 1955